The Face of Trespass is a psychological thriller novel by British writer Ruth Rendell, first published in 1974. The novel, largely told in flashbacks, follows Graham "Gray" Lanceton, a writer involved with a woman named Drusilla Browne who asks him to kill her wealthy husband. Lanceton becomes entangled in an intense, destructive affair with Browne, whom he sees as a "succubus."

An Affair in Mind, a movie adaptation of the novel by the BBC starring Stephen Dillane and Amanda Donohoe, was released in 1988.

References

1974 British novels
Novels by Ruth Rendell
Novels about writers
Hutchinson (publisher) books